Lisa Nordén (born 24 November 1984, Kristianstad, Skåne, Sweden) is a professional Swedish triathlete, 2012 Olympic silver medalist, and 2008 and 2016 Olympian. She is also the winner of the 2012 Triathlon World Series.

Nordén's other accomplishments include Swedish Champion of the year 2008, the U23 World Champion of the year 2007, the Sprint World Champion of the year 2010, vice World Champion (World Championship Series) of the year 2009, bronze medalist of the World Championship Series of the years 2008 and 2010, and bronze medalist at the European Championships 2010.

Athletic career
Nordén took the silver medal in triathlon at the 2012 Summer Olympics in London. She was credited with the same time (1:59.48) as gold medalist Nicola Spirig, but was edged out in a photo finish. The Swedish Olympic Committee (NOC) appealed the result to the Court of Arbitration for Sport (CAS). The appeal was denied the day after it was filed, Nordén said she was happy with her silver medal and considered it a gold medal.

Nordén additionally takes part in non ITU events. In 2010, she won three gold medals at Gladbeck, Witten and Schliersee (German open Championships). She has represented Stadtwerke Team Witten.

In June 2015, she competed in the inaugural European Games, for Sweden in women's triathlon. She earned a bronze medal.

Outside of triathlon, Nordén won the Swedish national cycling time trial championships in 2018,  and the Swedish national road cycling championships in 2019.

Personal life
In Sweden, Nordén lives in Stockholm, and represents Terrible Tuesdays Triathlon Club. Her training base is Stockholm since fall 2012.

ITU World Championship Series podiums 

1 Grand Final
2 Sprint Distance

Gallery

References

External links
 Norden's Official website
 Swedish Triathlon Federation in Swedish
 Nordén's Triathlon Club Kristianstad in Swedish

1984 births
Living people
People from Kristianstad Municipality
Swedish female triathletes
Triathletes at the 2008 Summer Olympics
Triathletes at the 2012 Summer Olympics
Triathletes at the 2016 Summer Olympics
Olympic triathletes of Sweden
Olympic silver medalists for Sweden
Olympic medalists in triathlon
Medalists at the 2012 Summer Olympics
European Games bronze medalists for Sweden
European Games medalists in triathlon
Triathletes at the 2015 European Games
Swedish female cyclists
Sportspeople from Skåne County
20th-century Swedish women
21st-century Swedish women